The Texas Independence Referendum Act, procedurally titled HB 3596 and also shortened to TEXIT, is pending Texas state legislation which, if passed, would call for a state referendum on the secession of Texas from the United States. While prior versions of the legislation have been introduced under similar titles, the most recent version was introduced by state representative Bryan Slaton on March 6, 2023. It has yet to be voted on by either chamber of the Texas state legislature.

Background 

In the early 2020s, the Republican Party of Texas In December 2020, when the Supreme Court refused to hear Texas' lawsuit in Texas v. Pennsylvania, the chair of the Texas GOP, Allen West, suggested that Texas and other like-minded states could leave the Union. The party called for the enactment of a referendum before 2023. 

Texan secession from the United States is noted as a fringe but popular movement within the Lone Star state, especially with "Texit" becoming a popular rallying slogan. As early as 2016, it was noted that 212,000 accounts had "liked" a Facebook page focused on Texan secession.

2021 bill 
On January 26, 2021, the first version of the Texas Independence Referendum Act (HB 1359), a bill to provide for a nonbinding statewide referendum on secession, was filed by Texas House member Kyle Biedermann. The bill was referred to the State Affairs committee but it was never given a hearing or voted on by the committee before the end of the session.

2023 bill 
Bryan Slaton introduced second version of the act was introduced on March 6, 2023. Slaton has been noted as having introduced bills and proposed rules which would give capital punishment to abortion-giving mothers, block Democrats from holding committee chairmanships, and criminalize gender-affirming health care for minors.

Provisions 
If passed by the legislature and signed by the governor, the legislation calls for the 2023 general election in Texas to include a referendum on whether the state should secede from the Union. The proposed legislation outlines that the referendum will be listed under "Referendum Proposition". If the bill succeeded, the state would form committee tasked with planning the next steps in the state seceding from the Union. The committee is designated specifically to make recommendations on amendments to the Constitution of Texas, creating new elected offices, renaming the state, and other procedures for the building of a nation. The legislation specifically recommends free trade agreements, a temporary currency union, and a common travel agreement. The committee will be abolished once the calendar year of 2025 begins.

Legislative history 
The bill was introduced on March 6, 2023, the 187th anniversary of the Battle of the Alamo.

Support and opposition 
Many outlets raise that Texas v. White, the Supreme Court case which ruled that secession from the United States is illegal, would prevent the enactment of the Texas Independent Referendum Act, even if the people voted in favor of it.

Proponents supporting the act, including Biedermann and Slaton, all state that the people of Texas should be given the right to vote on whether they wish to stay in the Union. Upon introducing the 2023 bill, Slaton further stated that the state constitution is "clear that all political power resides in the people". Slaton further alleges "decades of continuous abuse of our rights and liberties by the federal government".

References

External links 
Text of the bill
Proposed laws of the United States
Texas Legislature
Secession